Aq Darband may refer to:
 Aqdarband Coal Mine
 Darband-e Olya, Sarakhs
 Darband-e Sofla, Sarakhs